Sevlievo is a town in north-central Bulgaria, part of Gabrovo Province. Sevlievo is known as one of the wealthiest towns in Bulgaria owing to the well developed local economy, high employment rate and major foreign investments, such as the American Standard Companies factory. It is the administrative centre of the homonymous Sevlievo Municipality.

In 2009, the population of the town was 24,065.

History
The earliest traces of occupation in the region date back to the late Neolithic period (around the 8th century BC). Some Thracian tombs still survive. Hotalich Fortress is the last medieval town. It had been inhabited for more than 1,000 years and functioned as an important defensive center. Hotalich existed for centuries together with the settlement on the site of the contemporary town, known as Servi and Selvi.

In the middle of the 19th century, the development of crafts led to the concentration of large sums of money in the crafts' societies. Commercial trips across the Ottoman Empire, Europe and Russia enriched general knowledge.

In 1834 St Prophet Eliah Church was restored and in 1836 the medieval Batoshevo Monastery was rebuilt. In the mid-1850s, Kolyu Ficheto, a prominent master of the Bulgarian National Revival period, built the stone bridge over the Rositsa River. In 1844 the famous wealthy craftsman and merchant, Hadzhi Stoyan Nikolov, invested his own money in the building of a huge school.

In 1870, under the direct guidance of Vasil Levski, known as the "Apostle of Freedom", a revolutionary committee was created. It prepared the population of Sevlievo for the April Uprising in 1876. The Bulgarians from this region took an active part in the uprising.

Ottoman occupation of the town ended 2 July 1877. As a major cultural institute, the local community center has existed for 127 years. The Mara Belcheva House of Culture became the new center of cultural events.

Geography

Climate
Sevlievo has a temperate climate with cold winters and hot summers.

Population

Twin towns — sister cities

Sevlievo  is twinned with:

 Babruysk, Belarus
 Gevgelija, North Macedonia
 Legionowo, Poland
 Nanhai, China
 Valašské Meziříčí, Czech Republic

See also

  Gabrovo humour and jokes
 Ethnographic museum Etara
 Village of Bozhentsi
 City of Tryavna
 City of Dryanovo
 Dryanovo Monastery
 Sokolsky Monastery
 Winter Resort Uzana

References

External links
 Sevlievo municipality – cities and villages, maps, information
 Sevlievo municipality's home page
 Pictures from Sevlievo
 VisitSevlievo.com – Unofficial travel guide and on-line presentation of Sevlievo.
 Karacakılavuz Belediyesi

Original source
 Guide-bulgaria.com ("All text from Guide-Bulgaria.com is available for reproduction at external web sites if link to Guide-Bulgaria.com is added.")  The article has been edited from the source version.

Towns in Bulgaria
Populated places in Gabrovo Province